The bronze featherback (Notopterus notopterus;  kandhuli,,, Vietnamese: Cá thát lát) is a ray-finned fish in the family Notopteridae found in South and Southeast Asia. Although primarily found in fresh water, it has been known to enter brackish water. At present, it is the only member of the genus Notopterus, but as currently defined, it is likely a species complex.

Description

Young specimens are a dark bronze-like color that becomes lighter with age.

The bronze featherback can easily be kept in an aquarium. Popular as food, this fish also appears in a stamp of the Kingdom of Laos.

As food
This fish has been used as food in Southeast Asia since ancient times, and remains an important food item in countries such as Indonesia, Laos, Myanmar (Burma), and Thailand. It is preserved and prepared in different ways. 

In Burmese cuisine, the flesh of the bronze featherback, locally known as ngaphe, is used in ngachin, a pressed fish pickle, and is used to make fish paste.

In Thai cuisine, nam phrik pla salat pon (น้ำพริกปลาสลาดป่น) is a variety of nam phrik with minced roasted pla salat eaten along with raw vegetables. It is popular in Khorat. Although much smaller in size, it is similar in appearance to the Chitala ornata, another important fish in Thai cuisine.

See also
List of Thai ingredients

References

External links

Notopteridae
Freshwater fish of South Asia
Freshwater fish of Southeast Asia
Fish of Bangladesh
Fish of Pakistan

Fish described in 1769
Taxa named by Peter Simon Pallas